Geodermatophilus amargosae is a Gram-positive and aerobic bacterium from the genus Geodermatophilus which has been isolated from desert soil from the Amargosa Desert in the United States.

References

Bacteria described in 2014
Actinomycetia